Pierre-Simon is a French masculine given name, and may refer to:

 Pierre-Simon Ballanche (1776–1847), a French writer and counterrevolutionary philosopher
 Pierre Simon Fournier (1712–1768), a French typographer
 Pierre-Simon Girard (1765–1836), a French mathematician and engineer
 Pierre-Simon Laplace (1749–1827), a French mathematician and astronomer

See also 
 Pierre Simon
 Pierre Simon (1885–1977)

Compound given names
French masculine given names